Wernya is a genus of moths belonging to the subfamily Thyatirinae of the Drepanidae. It was described by Yoshimoto in 1987.

Species
griseochrysa species group
Wernya griseochrysa László, G. Ronkay & L. Ronkay, 2001
Wernya hreblayi László, G. Ronkay, L. Ronkay & Witt, 2007
lineofracta species group
Wernya cyrtoma D.-Y. Xue & H.-X. Han, 2012
Wernya karsholti László, G. Ronkay & L. Ronkay, 2001
Wernya lineofracta (Houlbert, 1921)
Wernya sechuana László, G. Ronkay & L. Ronkay, 2001
Wernya witti László, G. Ronkay & L. Ronkay, 2001
punctata species group
Wernya punctata Yoshimoto, 1987
rufifasciata species group
Wernya rufifasciata Yoshimoto, 1987
solena species group
Wernya baenzigeri Yoshimoto, 1996
Wernya solena (C. Swinhoe, 1894)
Wernya zita Laszlo, G. Ronkay, L. Ronkay & Witt, 2007
thailandica species group
Wernya thailandica Yoshimoto, 1987
unknown species group
Wernya hamigigantea D.-Y. Xue & H.-X. Han, 2012

References

 , 2007, Esperiana Buchreihe zur Entomologie Band 13: 1-683 
 , 2012: Genus Wernya Yoshimoto (Lepidoptera: Drepanidae: Thyatirinae) from China, with description of two new species and one new subspecies. Acta Zootaxonomica Sinica 37 (2): 350–356. Abstract and full article: .
 , 1987: Notes on Mimopsestis Matsumura, 1921, and its Allied New Genus, with Descriptions of Three New Species from Southeast Asia (Lepidoptera, Thyatiridae). Tyô to Ga 38 (1): 39–53. Abstract and full article: .

Thyatirinae
Drepanidae genera